Basi (1980 – 13 September 2017) was a female giant panda. Since Jia Jia's death in 2016, she was the oldest living panda in captivity.

Basi was the original model of ‘Panpan’, the mascot for the first Asian games (in China, 1990). She died at 8:50am on September 13, 2017, at the age of 37. The Straits Giant Panda Research and Exchange Center in Fuzhou, where she lived, held a memorial in her honour.

References 

Individual giant pandas
1980 animal births
2017 animal deaths